Yaylakavak Dam is a dam in Aydın Province, Turkey, built between 1991 and 1996. The development was backed by the Turkish State Hydraulic Works.

See also
List of dams and reservoirs in Turkey

References
DSI directory, State Hydraulic Works (Turkey), Retrieved December 16, 2009

Dams in Aydın Province